Martin Luther is a 1923 German silent historical film directed by Karl Wüstenhagen and starring Wüstenhagen, Dary Holm and Anton Walbrook. The film depicts the life of the 16th century Christian reformer Martin Luther. It was shot at historic sites in Erfurt and the Wartburg.

The film is still extant, but only through copies intended for distribution outside Germany.

Partial cast
 Karl Wüstenhagen as Martin Luther
 Dary Holm
 Anton Walbrook
 Wilhelm Diegelmann
 Elise Aulinger
 Eugen Gura
 Viktor Gehring
 Rudolf Hoch
 Charlotte Krüger

References

Bibliography
 Wipfler, Esther P. Martin Luther in Motion Pictures: History of a Metamorphosis. Vandenhoeck & Ruprecht, 2011.

External links

1923 films
Films of the Weimar Republic
German silent feature films
German historical films
1920s historical films
Films about Martin Luther
German black-and-white films
1920s German films